Andrej Komac (born 4 December 1979) is a former Slovenian international footballer.

International career
Komac has represented Slovenia at the under-21 level, before making his senior debut in 2004. He was selected to the final Slovenian squad for the 2010 FIFA World Cup. At the tournament, he played in two Group C matches as a late substitute and received one yellow card.

Honours
Gorica
Slovenian First League: 2004–05, 2005–06

See also
Slovenian international players

References

External links
 Player profile at NZS 
 

Living people
1979 births
People from Šempeter pri Gorici
Slovenian footballers
Association football midfielders
Slovenian expatriate footballers
ND Gorica players
NK Primorje players
NK Olimpija Ljubljana (1945–2005) players
C.S. Marítimo players
Djurgårdens IF Fotboll players
Maccabi Tel Aviv F.C. players
Ruch Chorzów players
Treviso F.B.C. 1993 players
Slovenian PrvaLiga players
Primeira Liga players
Allsvenskan players
Israeli Premier League players
Ekstraklasa players
Expatriate footballers in Portugal
Expatriate footballers in Sweden
Expatriate footballers in Israel
Expatriate footballers in Poland
Expatriate footballers in Italy
Slovenian expatriate sportspeople in Portugal
Slovenian expatriate sportspeople in Sweden
Slovenian expatriate sportspeople in Israel
Slovenian expatriate sportspeople in Poland
Slovenian expatriate sportspeople in Italy
Slovenia under-21 international footballers
Slovenia international footballers
2010 FIFA World Cup players
Slovenian football managers